Always Be My Maybe is a 2016 Philippine romantic-comedy film top-billed by Gerald Anderson and Arci Muñoz directed by Dan Villegas. It was released on February 24, 2016. The film Anderson and Muñoz's first participation in a project together.

Plot 
Jake del Mundo (Gerald Anderson) is a handsome boy who comes from a privileged background. After years as a carefree bachelor, he thinks he is now ready to settle down. On the night that he proposes marriage to his long-time girlfriend, Tracy, she finally has had enough of him and dumps him for another man. At the same time, Kristina "Tintin" Paraiso (Arci Muñoz) a make-up artist, idealistically dreams of a nearly "perfect" relationship and believes that the guy she's going out with is about to ask her to marry him. When he doesn't arrive to meet her in the restaurant, she finds out on Facebook that he has already committed himself to another girl, and shares her heartbreak on social media in a video that immediately goes viral.

After six months' time recovering from their failed relationships, Jake and Tintin meet in a beach resort that Jake owns, where Tintin is to work on an out-of-town job as a makeup artist with her colleagues Esang (Cacai Bautista), Ms. Andrè (Ricci Chan) and some friends. When the two cross paths, they end up spending an entire night drinking and talking about their personal lives until dawn. Before they part, they exchange numbers and agree to meet in Manila.

Jake, a hopeless romantic, and the jaded and outspoken Tintin, discovering each has been jilted, end up spending more and more time together. On a night out at a bar, they agree to be each other’s confidant to help find someone better than their exes.

Cast

Main Cast 
 Gerald Anderson as Jake Del Mundo – The male protagonist. He is a skirt chasing businessman who is trying to settle down at his age he will eventually meet Tin a complete opposite and a hopeless romantic.
 Arci Muñoz as Kristina "Tintin" Paraiso – A makeup artist and blogger. Her viral videos made her a hot topic on social media on HRT makeup tutorials and her viral video on love advice she will meet her match in Jake who is also a hopeless romantic.

Supporting Cast 
 Jane Oineza as Telay
 Cacai Bautista as Esang
 Ricci Chan as Andre
 TJ Trinidad as Carlo
 Tirso Cruz III as Jake's Dad
 Irma Adlawan as Mila
 Nikki Valdez as Tintin's Sister
 Carlo Aquino as Fred
 Matt Evans as Pancho
 Ahron Villena as Mikey
 Pepe Herrera as Bernard
 Jairus Aquino as Tintin's Brother
 Victor Silayan as Jeric Valdez
 Maika Rivera as  Tracy Jake's ex

Music 
The official theme songs of the film was "Free Fall into Love" performed by Marion Aunor and the classic song of Aegis, "Halik". The song "How Can I"  which, also performed by Marion, was also used in the steamy love scene of the movie.

References

External links 
 

2016 films
2016 romantic comedy films
Philippine romantic comedy films
Star Cinema films